Flake is a term used in Australia to indicate the flesh of any of several species of shark, particularly the gummy shark. The term probably arose in the late 1920s when the large-scale commercial shark fishery off the coast of Victoria was established. Until that time, shark was generally an incidental catch rather than a targeted species.

Flake rapidly became popular. It has a mild flavour, a soft texture that nevertheless remains well-defined after cooking, and a clean white appearance. A special advantage is that flake has no bones, because sharks are cartilaginous. These qualities, combined with the ready supply and a low price, saw flake become by far the most common type of fish to be served in Australian fish and chip shops. Flake remains popular, but it is no longer especially cheap. 

Although the primary shark species sold as flake is the gummy shark, several others are listed below.

 Gummy shark, Mustelus antarcticus
 School shark, Galeorhinus galeus
 Elephant fish, Callorhinchus milii
 Whiskery shark, Furgaleus macki
 Australian blacktip shark, Carcharhinus tilstoni
 Sawshark (any of several Pristiophorus species)
 Various dog sharks (family Squalidae)
 Wobbegong (family Orectolobidae)

During the late 1960s it became apparent that larger individuals of several shark species were contaminated with high levels of heavy metals, particularly mercury, and a public outcry eventually led to a ban on the sale of large school sharks in 1972, which remained in effect until 1985.

In Britain, nursehound is often sold as flake.

References 

Fish of Australia
Australian cuisine